Festival4Stars was a UK-based talent competition for singing and dancing open to all ages. Set up to combat the negative feedback given on mainstream reality shows, each contestant gets written feedback from 2 of the professional industry judges.

Competition sections 
 Solo Dance (Any Style)
 12 yrs & under 
 13–20 yrs
Solo Singing (Any song not from a Musical)
 14 yrs & Under
 15 yrs to Adult
Musical Solos (Songs  from Musical Theatre productions or  films)
 14 yrs & Under
 15 yrs to Adult
Musical Group  (Songs  from Musical Theatre productions or  films)
 Open to all age groups, no limit. 
 Dance Duos / Trios & Groups (Any Style)
 Star Group (Anything that could not fit into any other category)

Expansion of heats 
Festival4stars started in 2002 a four-heat pilot in the West Of Scotland.

2003 and 2004 saw a growth to heats in seven regions in Scotland and England and in 2005 this grew even bigger to nine regions of the UK.

In 2011 Festival4Stars will have 25 11 regions encompassing Northern Ireland, Wales, England and Scotland.  Adding the seven regional finals, and two national finals, 2011 will have 34 events.

2011 Heats 
Central London
East of Scotland
London Regional
North of England
North East of England
Northern Ireland
South of England
Wales
West of England
West Midlands
West of Scotland

Supporters
Patron
Andrew Castle
Ambassadors
Duncan James
Cheryl Baker

Former Winners
Soraya Mafi
Faryl Smith
George Sampson
Alice Barlow
Kelsey-Beth Crossley
Natalie Grace Chua
Molly Scott
Jade Thirlwall

References

Talent shows